The 2015 Men's Southeast Asian Games Rugby sevens Tournament was held in Choa Chu Kang Stadium, Singapore from 6 to 7 June 2015.

In the final, the  beat  to win the gold medal.

Results

Preliminary round

5th–6th place playoff

Third place match

Final

Final standing

External links
Rugby Sevens Schedule and Results

Men